The Dongfeng Fengshen A60 is a compact sedan produced by Dongfeng Motor Corporation under the Dongfeng Fengshen sub-brand.

Overview
The Dongfeng Fengshen A60 sedan debuted during the 2011 Guangzhou Auto Show and production started in December 2011, with the A60 being listed on the market in March 2012.

The Dongfeng Fengshen A60 compact sedan shares the same platform as the later introduced Fengxing Jingyi S50 compact sedan with both cars based on the Nissan Sylphy produced by the Dongfeng-Nissan joint venture in China.

The Dongfeng Fengshen A60 sits above the cheaper yet similarly sized Fengshen S30 subcompact sedan and Fengshen H30 compact hatchback. 

A second facelift completely changing the front DRG styling was released placing the Fengshen A60 sedan more inline with other Dongfeng Fengshen products.

Dongfeng Fengshen A60 EV

Dongfeng revealed the Fengshen A60 EV alongside the 2015 Fengshen A60 facelift in October 2015. The Dongfeng Fengshen A60 EV was renamed to Dongfeng Fengshen E70 after the facelift placing the E70 inline with the 2015 facelift of the petrol-powered A60.

Aeolus E70
The Dongfeng Fengshen E70 received a facelift in 2019 and was revealed during the 2019 Shanghai Auto Show. The facelift sets the appearance of the EV further apart from the Fengshen A60 petrol sedan, and now carries the nameplate of the revised English brand name, Aeolus, in the rear.

References

External links 

 Fengshen A60 Official Website
 Fengshen E70 Official Website

Fengshen A60
Compact cars
Cars introduced in 2011
Vehicles with CVT transmission
Front-wheel-drive vehicles
Sedans
Cars of China
Production electric cars